Z18 small nucleolar RNA (also known as SNORD74 and U74) is a non-coding RNA (ncRNA) molecule which functions in the modification of other small nuclear RNAs (snRNAs). This type of modifying RNA is usually located in the nucleolus of the eukaryotic cell which is a major site of snRNA biogenesis. It is known as a small nucleolar RNA (snoRNA) and also often referred to as a guide RNA.
Z18 snoRNA belongs to the C/D box class of snoRNAs which contain the conserved sequence motifs known as the C box (UGAUGA) and the D box (CUGA). Most of the members of the box C/D family function in directing site-specific 2'-O-methylation of substrate RNAs.

See also 
Z6 small nucleolar RNA
Z12 small nucleolar RNA
Z30 small nucleolar RNA

References

External links 
 
 snoRNABase page for U74

Small nuclear RNA